Charles Marie Pierre Albert, 1st Count de Broqueville (4 December 1860 – 5 September 1940) was the prime minister of Belgium, serving during World War I.

Before 1914

Charles de Broqueville was born into an old noble family with its roots in French Gascony. He was the son of Count Stanislas de Broqueville (1830-1919) and Claire de Briey (1832-1876). He received private education from Catholic priest Charles Simon, from which he also learned Dutch. He married Berthe d'Huart (1864-1937), a granddaughter of Catholic statesman Jules Malou, through which he gained further connections to politics.

First elected to the Chamber of Representatives in the 1892 election, he represented the arrondissement of Turnhout until June 1919. He was seen as part of de jonge rechterzijde (the young right-wing), and was politically a midway between Christian democracy and more traditional forms of conservatism.

The leader of Belgium's Catholic Party, he served as prime minister between 1911 and 1918 and headed the de Broqueville government.
 
Once it became clear that Germany intended to violate Belgian neutrality in August 1914, he oversaw Belgium's mobilization for war. Despite the mobilization, de Broqueville opposed King Albert I's proposal to deploy the Belgian Army along the German frontier in 1914 but strategically placed them throughout the country. He recognized that wartime support for Belgium depended upon its continued status as a nonprovocative neutral power.

During the war, de Broqueville was more willing to make concessions to the Flemish Movement than King Albert, in order to secure Belgian unity in the long term. He made several promises to the movements for after the war, such as the Dutchification of Ghent University and better conditions for the Dutch language in standard education.

In 1917, he proposed a customs union between France and Belgium, in order to help Belgium recover post-war, though the idea was rejected, out of fear that Belgium would become a junior partner in such a union.

First World War

The German invasion of 1914 forced the Belgian government into exile at Le Havre. De Broqueville fought the King on the neutrality issue and so denied Belgium a full alliance with the Allied forces.

The opposition of the King critically weakened de Broqueville's stance among members of his cabinet. Consequently, he resigned as Foreign Secretary in January 1918 and as Prime Minister in May when he lost the support of his own party.

De Broqueville also served as minister in various departments:
Minister of Railways and PTT (Posts, Telegraphs and Telephones) 1910–1912
Minister of War 1912–1917
Minister of Foreign Affairs 1917
Minister of Reconstruction 1917–1918
Minister of the Interior 1918–1919
Minister of National Defence 1926–1930

Postwar

Later, Charles de Broqueville became Prime Minister a second time, serving from 22 October 1932 to 20 November 1934. He died on 5 September 1940, during the second German occupation of Belgium.

Titles 

 1867 – 1919: Baron Charles de Broqueville
 1919 – 1920: Charles, Baron de Broqueville
 After 1920: Charles, Count de Broqueville

Honours

Belgian 

 : 
Croix de Guerre
Minister of State,  by Royal Decree.
 Grand Cordon of the Order of Leopold (1919)

Foreign 

 : Knight of the Order of the Dannebrog
 : 
Grand Croix of the Légion d'honneur
 decorated with the Croix de Guerre
 : Grand Cross of the Order of the Redeemer 
 : Knight with the Collar of the Order of Pius IX.
 : 1st class in the Order of the Rising Sun
 : Knight Grand Cross of the Order of Saints Maurice and Lazarus, 
 : Grand Cross of the Order of the Oak Crown
 : Knight Grand Cross of the Order of the Netherlands Lion,
 : Knight Grand Cross of the Order of St Michael and St George
 Knight of the Order of the White Eagle (Russian Empire), 
 Knight Grand Cross of the Order of the Crown of Romania,
 Knight Grand Cross of the Portuguese Order of Christ (Portugal)
 Knight Grand Cross of the Order of the Zähringer Lion (Grand Duchy of Baden)

Arms

See also

 List of prime ministers of Belgium
 List of defence ministers of Belgium
 Belgium in World War I
 Belgian nationalism

Notes

Sources

 Louis DE LICHTERVELDE, Charles de Broqueville, in: Biographie Nationale de Belgique, t. XXIX, 1956-1957, p. 369-377.
 Paul VAN MOLLE, La parlement belge, 1894-1972, Antwerp, 1972
 Luc SCHEPENS, Albert Ier et le gouvernement Broqueville, 1914–1918 : aux origines de la question communautaire. Paris 1983,
 Thierry DENOËL, Le nouveau dictionnaire des Belges, 2e éd. revue et augm., Brussels, Le Cri, 1992, p. 167.
 Maria DE WAELE, Charles de Broqueville, in: Nieuwe Encyclopedie van de Vlaamse Beweging, Tielt, 1998
 Paul VOS, Charles de Broqueville op de kering der tijden, in: Vlaamse Stam, 2012, blz. 122-142.
 Frans RENAERS, De opvoeding van Charles de Broqueville, in: Vlaamse Stam, blz 142-145.

External links

 Charles de Broqueville at Prime Minister of Belgium
 Laurence van Ypersele: Broqueville, Charles Marie Pierre Albert, Baron de, in: 1914-1918-online. International Encyclopedia of the First World War.
 
 Charles de Broqueville in ODIS - Online Database for Intermediary Structures 

1860 births
1940 deaths
Belgian Ministers of State
Belgian nobility
Belgian people of World War I
Catholic Party (Belgium) politicians
Counts of Belgium
Grand Croix of the Légion d'honneur
Grand Crosses of the Order of Christ (Portugal)
Grand Crosses of the Order of the Crown (Romania)
Honorary Knights Grand Cross of the Order of St Michael and St George
Knights Grand Cross of the Order of Saints Maurice and Lazarus
Knights of the Order of the Dannebrog
Grand Cordons of the Order of the Rising Sun
Recipients of the Order of the White Eagle (Russia)
Recipients of the Croix de Guerre (France)
Recipients of the Croix de guerre (Belgium)
People from Antwerp Province
Prime Ministers of Belgium
Belgian Ministers of Defence
Foreign ministers of Belgium
Interior ministers of Belgium
People from Mol, Belgium
20th-century Belgian politicians
19th-century Belgian politicians